Hidden Valley is an eastern suburb in the city of Darwin, in the Northern Territory of Australia.

References 

Suburbs of Darwin, Northern Territory
Places in the unincorporated areas of the Northern Territory